Cristian Adrián Canan (born 3 November 1995) is an Argentine professional footballer who plays as a midfielder for Los Andes.

Club career
Canan started in the youth ranks of Boca Juniors, prior to signing with Almirante Brown. He made his professional debut for the Primera B Metropolitana team on 21 August 2015, featuring for sixty-four minutes of a 1–0 victory over Atlanta. He made six appearances in each of his first two seasons, prior to appearing over twenty-five times in each of the following two. In the latter, 2017–18, Canan scored his opening senior goals against Comunicaciones and Tristán Suárez respectively.

In June 2019, Canan departed Almirante Brown with the intention of playing abroad. However, in the succeeding November, he resigned with the club to replace Luis Arias who suffered a knee-ligament injury. In his first match back, a reserve game with JJ Urquiza, Canan picked up a similar serious injury. In February 2022, Canan joined Los Andes.

International career
In 2016, Canan represented Argentina at U23 level in India at the Sait Nagjee Trophy.

Career statistics
.

References

External links

1995 births
Living people
Sportspeople from Buenos Aires Province
Argentine footballers
Argentina youth international footballers
Association football midfielders
Primera B Metropolitana players
Club Almirante Brown footballers
Club Atlético Los Andes footballers